
Ernst König (12 August 1908  – 3 March 1986) was a German general in the Wehrmacht of Nazi Germany during World War II.  He was a recipient of the  Knight's Cross of the Iron Cross with Oak Leaves.

Awards and decorations
 Iron Cross (1939) 2nd Class (1 October 1939) & 1st Class  (10 October 1940)
 German Cross in Gold on 7 March 1942 as Hauptmann in the III./Infanterie-Regiment 82
 Knight's Cross of the Iron Cross with Oak Leaves
 Knight's Cross on 16 September 1943 as Major and commander of Grenadier-Regiment 12
 598th Oak Leaves on 21 September 1944 as Oberst and commander of Grenadier-Regiment 12

References

Citations

Bibliography

 
 
 

1908 births
1986 deaths
People from Fulda
People from Hesse-Nassau
Major generals of the German Army (Wehrmacht)
Recipients of the Gold German Cross
Recipients of the Knight's Cross of the Iron Cross with Oak Leaves
German prisoners of war in World War II
Military personnel from Hesse